Montrichardia is a genus of flowering plants in the family Araceae. It contains two species, Montrichardia arborescens and Montrichardia linifera, and one extinct species Montrichardia aquatica. The genus is helophytic and distributed in tropical America (West Indies, Belize, Brazil, Colombia, Costa Rica, French Guiana, Guatemala, Guyana, Honduras, Nicaragua, Panama, Peru, Puerto Rico, Suriname, Trinidad, Tobago, and Venezuela).  The extinct species M. aquatica is known from fossils found in a Neotropical rainforest environment preserved in the Paleocene Cerrejón Formation of Colombia.  Living Montrichardia species have a diploid chromosome number of 2n=48.

Species
†Montrichardia aquatica Herrera  - Colombia in Paleocene 
Montrichardia arborescens  (L.) Schott - West Indies, Belize, northwestern Brazil, Colombia, Costa Rica, French Guiana, Guatemala, Guyana, Honduras, Nicaragua, Panama, Peru, Puerto Rico, Suriname, Trinidad, Tobago, Venezuela
Montrichardia linifera (Arruda) Schott - northern and eastern Brazil, Venezuela, Colombia, Ecuador, Peru, the Guianas

References

Aroideae
Araceae genera